Berezhok is a rural locality (a village) in Vozhbalskoye Rural Settlement, Totemsky  District, Vologda Oblast, Russia. The population was 12 as of 2002.

Geography 
Berezhok is located 40 km west of Totma (the district's administrative centre) by road. Lodygino is the nearest rural locality.

References 

Rural localities in Totemsky District